HNLMS K 3 may refer to one of three ships of the Royal Netherlands Navy named K 3 or K III:

  (1920), a  patrol submarine
 HNLMS K3 (1941),  sloop, captured by the Germans and commissioned in to the Kriegsmarine. Repaired after the war and returned to Dutch service as frigate Van Speijk

Royal Netherlands Navy ship names